The 1947 National Invitation Tournament was the 1947 edition of the annual NCAA college basketball competition. The Utah Utes won the tournament, led by Wataru Misaka. Misaka later joined the New York Knicks and became the first person of color to play in modern professional basketball. 

In the championship game against the Kentucky Wildcats, Utah held star Ralph Beard to a single point. Beard later pleaded guilty for his part in the 1951 NCAA point shaving scandal.

Selected teams
Below is a list of the 8 teams selected for the tournament.

 Bradley
 Duquesne
 Kentucky
 Long Island
 NC State
 St. John's
 Utah
 West Virginia

Bracket
Below is the tournament bracket.

See also
 1947 NCAA basketball tournament
 1947 NAIA Division I men's basketball tournament

References

National Invitation
National Invitation Tournament
1940s in Manhattan
Basketball in New York City
College sports in New York City
Madison Square Garden
National Invitation Tournament
National Invitation Tournament
Sports competitions in New York City
Sports in Manhattan